James Cipperly (born May 4, 1984), better known by his ring name Orange Cassidy, is an American professional wrestler and wrestling trainer. He is currently signed to All Elite Wrestling (AEW), where he is the inaugural and current AEW International Champion in his first reign.

Prior to signing with AEW, he had previously performed for the Chikara promotion as the luchador enmascarado (masked professional wrestler), Fire Ant. Fire Ant was part of the Colony stable, which won the Campeonatos de Parejas once and Chikara's premier King of Trios tournament twice. During his time in Chikara, he also appeared unmasked as a member of The Gentleman's Club faction, alongside Chuck Taylor and Drew Gulak, and was a trainer at the promotion's Wrestle Factory school. He also wrestled prominently on the independent circuit from 2004 to 2019.

Early life and education
James Cipperly was born on May 4, 1984, in the Stewartsville section of Greenwich Township, Warren County, New Jersey. He graduated in 2002 from Phillipsburg High School. Five years later, he graduated from the New Jersey Institute of Technology with a Bachelor of Science in Architecture.

Professional wrestling career

Early career (2004–2006)
Cipperly debuted on March 13, 2004, for the Hanover, Pennsylvania-based Ground Breaking Wrestling (GBW) promotion. Wrestling as "JC Ryder", he teamed with Danny Rage as the New Jersey Independent All-Stars. Throughout 2004, Ryder wrestled primarily for GBW; he also made appearances with the Eastern Wrestling Alliance in Baltimore, Maryland and with the Valley Wrestling Alliance in Wilkes-Barre, Pennsylvania. In January 2005, Ryder and Rage defeated Xtreme Pandemonium to win the GBW Tag Team Championship. They held the titles until May 2005, when they lost to CORE and Ian Cross. They won the titles a second time in April 2006 by defeating the Untouchables, dropping them back to the Untouchables that December.

Chikara (2005, 2012–2016)

Cipperly (as JC Ryder) debuted in the Pennsylvania-based Chikara promotion in February 2005 at the Tag World Grand Prix. In March and April 2005, he and Danny Rage (as the New Jersey Independent All-Stars) competed in a series of tag team matches. In June 2005, he competed in a qualifying match for the Chikara Young Lions Cup, losing to Rorschach. The following year, he began wrestling under a mask as Fire Ant, the leader of the Colony, a role he continued to portray for the next thirteen years.

In 2012, Cipperly began working unmasked by using the Orange Cassidy ring name. Despite having wrestled under the ring name since 2007, this version of the character was a precursor to his current look in All Elite Wrestling (AEW). The same year, Chuck Taylor formed The Gentlemen's Club, which consisted of Taylor, Cassidy, Drew Gulak and the Swamp Monster. Cassidy made his debut at Live At Road To Ruin Fest, where he was swiftly defeated by Grizzly Redwood. He returned two years later at King of Trios, where the Gentleman's Club were defeated by the Submission Squad. During 2015, the Gentlemen's Club were announced as being part of the Challenge of the Immortals tournament. Cassidy was used in tag team and six-man matches, as the stable won six points, failing to advance to the finals. In 2016, Taylor was involved in a storyline where he kept changing his ring name after matches, in what was part of a larger legal battle with the new owner of the "Chuck Taylor" name, Chuck Taylor™. This culminated at Aniversario: The Lost World in Glasgow, where Taylor (as "Howie Dewitt") defeated Cassidy, who was seconded by Taylor™. At King of Trios, Cassidy and Gulak participated in a tag team gauntlet match, eliminating The Closers and Team Sea Stars, before being eliminated by Cornelius Crummels and Sonny Defarge. At Judgment Day, Team Sea Stars defeated Cassidy and the Swamp Monster, marking the final time that Cipperly would appear in the promotion as Orange Cassidy.

All Elite Wrestling (2019–present)

On May 25, 2019, Cassidy made his debut for All Elite Wrestling (AEW), during their inaugural event Double or Nothing, where he entered the Casino Battle Royale late and confronted Tommy Dreamer, before Dreamer threw him out. On August 12, it was announced that Cassidy had signed a contract with AEW. On August 31, at All Out, Cassidy returned and aligned himself with Best Friends (Chuck Taylor and Trent), after saving them from an attack by The Dark Order (Stu Grayson and Evil Uno). Cassidy wrestled his debut match for AEW on the October 30 episode of Dynamite, teaming with Best Friends for a victory over Q. T. Marshall, Alex Reynolds and John Silver in a six-man tag team match.

Cassidy started his first rivalry in AEW with Pac in February 2020, after Cassidy interrupted Pac while he was being interviewed. On February 29, at Revolution, Cassidy was defeated by Pac. Cassidy's performance in the match was praised by critics. On May 23, at Double or Nothing, Cassidy participated in the Casino Ladder Match, but the match was won by Brian Cage. Cassidy next began a feud with Chris Jericho, and was defeated by Jericho during the second night of Fyter Fest on July 8. Cassidy won a rematch on the August 12 episode of Dynamite, and was challenged by Jericho to a Mimosa Mayhem match for All Out, which Cassidy also won. Across September and October, Cassidy challenged for the AEW TNT Championship, but was unsuccessful on each occasion. On November 7, at Full Gear, Cassidy defeated John Silver.

Going into 2021, Cassidy and Best Friends started a feud with Kip Sabian and Miro. On March 7, at Revolution, Cassidy and Chuck Taylor were defeated by Sabian and Miro, but Cassidy and Taylor defeated the team in an Arcade Anarchy match on the March 31 episode of Dynamite. In May, Cassidy received an opportunity for the AEW World Championship. He competed for the championship at Double or Nothing in a three-way match against champion Kenny Omega and Pac, but Omega ended up winning. On September 5, at All Out, Cassidy was on the winning side as Best Friends and Jurassic Express defeated the Hardy Family Office. Afterwards, he was attacked by the returning Butcher, and almost had his head shaved, before the other babyfaces came out to make the save. Later in the night, he accompanied Kris Statlander in her match against Britt Baker. This was notable for a spot where Cassidy broke character, to urge Statlander to beat the count and get back in the ring. On the October 6 episode of Dynamite, Cassidy participated in the seven-man Casino Ladder match for a future shot at the AEW World Championship. The match ended up being won by Adam Page. Cassidy was then put into the AEW World Championship Eliminator Tournament and defeated Powerhouse Hobbs in the first round. He was scheduled to face Jon Moxley in the semi-finals, but Moxley was removed from the tournament due to going into rehabilitation for alcoholism. Moxley was replaced by Miro, who defeated Cassidy.

In November, Cassidy and the rest of the Best Friends stable, began a feud with The Elite, specifically Cassidy with Adam Cole. On the [[Holiday Bash (2021)|December 22 episode of Dynamite]], Cole defeated Cassidy after an interference from the debuting Kyle O'Reilly. On the December 29 episode of Dynamite, Cassidy and Best Friends were defeated by Cole and ReDRagon. On the January 19 episode of Dynamite, Cole and Baker defeated Cassidy and Statlander in a mixed tag team match, with Cole scoring another victory on Cassidy. On the January 26 episode of Dynamite, Cassidy defeated Cole in an Unsanctioned Lights Out match that involved appearances from Best Friends, The Young Bucks, Bobby Fish and the debuting Danhausen. Cassidy would qualify for the "Face of the Revolution" ladder match by defeating Anthony Bowens, but would fail to win the match at Revolution. Days later, it was reported that Cassidy had suffered a shoulder injury during the match, leaving him out of action for months.

Cassidy returned from injury on the June 15 episode of Dynamite, where he interrupted United Empire's assault on FTR and Roppongi Vice, confronting leader Will Ospreay. Soon after, a match was set between the two at AEW x NJPW: Forbidden Door, with Ospreay's IWGP United States Heavyweight Championship on the line. At the event, Ospreay defeated Cassidy. Ospreay and Aussie Open continued to beat down Cassidy and Roppongi Vice after the match, only to be stopped and attacked by Katsuyori Shibata.

On October 12, 2022 episode of Dynamite, Cassidy defeated longtime rival Pac to win the AEW All-Atlantic Championship - marking his first title in All Elite Wrestling.  In March 2023, the title would be renamed the AEW International Championship.

 Professional wrestling style and persona 

Having wrestled for over a decade and taking his current ring name around 2007, Cipperly's "Orange Cassidy" gimmick is based upon a single scene in Wet Hot American Summer, involving the character portrayed by Paul Rudd. In addition, his entrance music on the independent circuit (and later in All Elite Wrestling), is "Jane" by Jefferson Starship which was the song used in the opening credits of the aforementioned film. He has also been compared to the unnamed character portrayed by Ryan Gosling in Drive. Cipperly stated that he created the gimmick to differentiate himself from other wrestlers better than him, as well as a "middle finger to professional wrestling". He explained his character's motivations as "If I have to wrestle, I'll wrestle. [...] It's like one of those things, you have a job, you're good at it, but you know, do you really wanna?"

He is commonly referred to as "The King of Sloth Style" due to his slow movement and lackadaisical attacks. One of his signature moves is very light taps to the opponent's shins, sometimes dubbed the "Slow Motion Kick" or the "Kicks of Doom". He is also known for his non sequitur promos, such as winning a debate with Chris Jericho by discussing his near-savant knowledge of climate change instead of wrestling.

After his debut for All Elite Wrestling in 2019, he has been referred to as "the most popular wrestler in AEW" by some wrestling writers. AEW founder and co-owner Tony Khan said that the WarnerMedia executives (the parent company of TBS and TNT, the networks on which AEW's programming airs) love his character. ESPN named him "wrestling's male breakout star of 2020."

Championships and accomplishments

 All Elite Wrestling
AEW International Championship (1 time, current, inaugural)
AEW All-Atlantic Championship (1 time, final)
2023 Casino Tag Team Royale (with Danhausen)
Alpha-1 Wrestling
A1 Zero Gravity Championship (1 time)
Chikara
Campeonatos de Parejas (1 time) – with Soldier Ant
Young Lions Cup VI – (1 time)
King of Trios (2011, 2018) – with Green Ant and Soldier Ant (1) – with Green Ant (II) and Thief Ant (1)
Tag World Grand Prix (2008) – with Soldier Ant
DDT Pro-Wrestling
Ironman Heavymetalweight Championship (1 time)
Forza Lucha!
Forza Lucha Cup Championship (1 time)
Forza Lucha Cup (2014)
Ground Breaking Wrestling
GBW Tag Team Championship (2 times) – with Danny Rage
F1RST Wrestling
F1RST Wrestling Uptown VFW Championship (1 time)
IndependentWrestling.TV
Independent Wrestling Championship (2 times)
 Pro Wrestling Illustrated Most Popular Wrestler of the Year (2020)
 Ranked No. 21 of the top 500 singles wrestlers in the PWI 500 in 2021
Revolution Eastern Wrestling
REW Pakistan Championship (1 time)
WrestleJam
WrestleJam Championship (1 time)Wrestling Observer Newsletter''
Best Gimmick (2020)

Luchas de Apuestas record

References

External links

Chikara profile

1984 births
Living people
21st-century professional wrestlers
AEW All-Atlantic Champions
All Elite Wrestling personnel
American male professional wrestlers
People from Greenwich Township, Warren County, New Jersey
Phillipsburg High School (New Jersey) alumni
New Jersey Institute of Technology alumni
Professional wrestlers from New Jersey
Professional wrestling trainers
Sportspeople from Warren County, New Jersey
Ironman Heavymetalweight Champions